Nemognatha cribraria is a species of blister beetle in the family Meloidae. It is found in North America.

Subspecies
These two subspecies belong to the species Nemognatha cribraria:
 Nemognatha cribraria cribraria LeConte, 1853
 Nemognatha cribraria fuscula Enns, 1956

References

Further reading

External links

 

Meloidae
Articles created by Qbugbot
Beetles described in 1853